Erik Wanderley is a Brazilian Jiu-Jitsu and MMA competitor.

In 2003 he became the Super Heavy World Jiu-jitsu Champion. He began his MMA career in the same year when he was defeated by Maurício Rua in his first fight by TKO.

In 2005 he defeated Rodrigo Gripp de Sousa by submission in the first round at the Storm Samurai event.

Mixed martial arts record

|-
|Loss
|align=center|3-3
|Carlos Eduardo
|TKO (punches) 
|IFC - International Fighter Championship
|
|align=center|3
|align=center|1:24
|Recife, Pernambuco, Brazil
|
|-
|Win
|align=center|3-2
|Eduardo Camaleao
|TKO (punches) 
|Brazil Fight 2 - Minas Gerais vs. Rio de Janeiro
|
|align=center|1
|align=center|4:02
|Belo Horizonte, Minas Gerais, Brazil
|
|-
|Win
|align=center|2-2
|Johnny Marcus
|Submission (heel hook) 
|BF - Brazil Fight
|
|align=center|1
|align=center|N/A
|Belo Horizonte, Minas Gerais, Brazil
|
|-
|Win
|align=center|1-2
|Rodrigo Gripp de Sousa
|Submission
|SS 8 - Storm Samurai 8
|
|align=center|1
|align=center|N/A
|Brasília, Brazil
|
|-
|Loss
|align=center|0-2
|Ebenezer Fontes Braga
|Decision (unanimous)
|Heat FC 2 - Evolution
|
|align=center|3
|align=center|5:00
|Natal, Rio Grande do Norte, Brazil
|
|-
|Loss
|align=center|0–1
|Maurício Rua
|TKO (punches) 
|IFC - Global Domination
|
|align=center|2
|align=center|2:54
|Denver, Colorado, United States
|

References

External links

Official site
Official MMA Record from Sherdog

Living people
Brazilian practitioners of Brazilian jiu-jitsu
Brazilian male mixed martial artists
Light heavyweight mixed martial artists
Mixed martial artists utilizing Brazilian jiu-jitsu
Year of birth missing (living people)